Vrchotovy Janovice is a market town in Benešov District in the Central Bohemian Region of the Czech Republic. It has about 1,000 inhabitants.

Administrative parts
Villages of Braštice, Hůrka, Libohošť, Manělovice, Mrvice, Rudoltice, Šebáňovice, Sedlečko and Velká Lhota are administrative parts of Vrchotovy Janovice.

Etymology
The name Janovice was derived from the name of its founders, who were the lords of Janovice. The attribute Vrchotovy was added in the 15th century and came from the following owners of the settlement, the Vrchota of Vrchotice family.

Geography
It lies in the Benešov Uplands. The territory is rich on ponds, the largest are Libohošťský and Zrcadlo.

History
The first written mention of Janovice is from 1224. From the 1430s to 1528, the estate was owned by the Vrchota of Vrchotice family, and the name of the market town changed to Vrchotovy Janovice. In 1879, Vrchotovy Janovice was bought by the family of Baron Karel Ludvík Nádherný of Borutín.

During World War II, a subcamp of the Flossenbürg concentration camp was established here. In April 1944, a military training ground for SS units was established here, and the inhabitants were displaced until the end of the war.

Demographics

Sights

The main landmark of Vrchotovy Janovice is a romantic castle surrounded by a large park. The castle was founded in about 1350 as a Gothic water fortress. Then it was rebuilt in the Renaissance and Baroque styles before 1760. Prague architect Josef Mocker rebuilt it in the Neo-Gothic style after 1879, and Josef Zasche further rebuilt it around 1910 for the Nádherný of Borutín family. The last owner of the castle was Baroness Nádherná, unconventional emancipated woman, a patron and organizer of cultural life. She hosted here friends including Rainer Maria Rilke, Karl Kraus and Max Švabinský.

In 1988 the National Museum in Prague opened a permanent exhibition at the castle about the Czech National Revival cultural movement of the 19th century.

The second landmark is the Church of Saint Martin. It was built in the Romanesque style at the end of the 12th century. In the 14th century, it was rebuilt in the Gothic style, neo-Gothic modifications were made in the 19th century. The church is architecturally very valuable.

Notable people
Sidonie Nádherná of Borutín (1885–1950), baroness

Gallery

References

External links

Populated places in Benešov District
Market towns in the Czech Republic